Victor de Almeida Sandes (born 8 January 1992), commonly known as Esquerdinha, is a Brazilian footballer who plays as a midfielder for Concórdia.

References

External links
 

1992 births
Living people
Brazilian footballers
Association football midfielders
Club Athletico Paranaense players
Guaratinguetá Futebol players
Brasília Futebol Clube players
Guarany Sporting Club players
FC Dunav Ruse players
Concórdia Atlético Clube players
Sociedade Esportiva Decisão Futebol Clube players
Campeonato Brasileiro Série A players
First Professional Football League (Bulgaria) players
Expatriate footballers in Bulgaria
People from Garanhuns
Sportspeople from Pernambuco